Sofia Lodi (born 29 January 1998) is an Italian female rhythmic gymnast. A member of the national squad since 2015, Centofanti ascended to prominence on the international scene at the 2016 Summer Olympics, where she and fellow rhythmic gymnasts Martina Centofanti, Camilla Patriarca, Marta Pagnini, and Alessia Maurelli attained a total score of 35.549 on the combination of hoops, ribbons, and clubs for the fourth spot in the final, slipping her team off the podium by nearly two tenths of a point.

Detailed Olympic results

References

External links 
 
 Sofia Lodi at the Italian Olympic Committee (CONI)

1998 births
Living people
Italian rhythmic gymnasts
Sportspeople from Brescia
Gymnasts at the 2016 Summer Olympics
Olympic gymnasts of Italy
European Games competitors for Italy
Gymnasts at the 2015 European Games
Medalists at the Rhythmic Gymnastics European Championships
Medalists at the Rhythmic Gymnastics World Championships
21st-century Italian women